A. O. Zoss was an American engineer, having been elected a Fellow of the American Association for the Advancement of Science in 1951. He worked as a technical advisor to US occupation forces in Germany immediately after World War II.

References 

Fellows of the American Association for the Advancement of Science
21st-century American engineers
Living people
American expatriates in Germany
Year of birth missing (living people)
Place of birth missing (living people)